RK DreamWest is an Indian-American film director, screenwriter, and cinematographer. RK started his creative career in Theater, and directed several theater productions including the most acclaimed "The Journey" [2009] and "Uthirkaalam" (Fall Season) [2013]. RK made his feature film debut with Orange Valley under the banner of Dreamwest Global, followed by Fourth River (2020), that had official selection in several international film festivals and won many accolades.

Personal life 

RK born to his Indian parents Appukuttan Nair and Bhavani Amma in Trivandrum, Kerala, India. He completed his master's degree from University of Kerala and started his career as an IT Professional. He married Radha G Nair in 1988 and the couple got divorced in 2003. They have a son Nandu Radhakrishnan. In 1998, RK immigrated to the United States. RK lives with his family in Richmond, Virginia, United States of America since 2001.

Career

In 2014, RK moved into filmmaking. Next four years he acquainted with several Hollywood filmmakers and mastered the craft of filmmaking. In 2018 RK debuted his first feature film Orange Valley under the banner Dreamwest Global. In 2020, RK directed his second feature film Fourth River, and released it on June 28, 2020.

Filmography

Awards

 Canadian Cinematography Awards June 2020.
 Prague International Film Festival July 2020 - 3rd Best Feature Film/ Best Director Feature Film/ Best Cinematography.

References

External links 
 

Malayalam film directors
Malayali people
21st-century Indian film directors
Living people
1963 births